Port of Qinhuangdao is a seaport on the Bohai Sea, located in the Haigang District of urban Qinhuangdao, Hebei, People's Republic of China.

Together with the Port of Huanghua, Qinhuangdao Port is a major port for coal transportation.

Qinhuangdao is the nation's coal shipping center which is also seen as a barometer of the economy. The daily transport capacity was at least 50 vessels per day in the past.

Notes

External links
Port of Qinhuangdao website

 

Ports and harbours of China
Bohai Sea